Mujhe Jeene Do is a 1963 Hindi film, directed by Moni Bhattacharjee and written by Aghajani Kashmeri. This dacoit drama stars Sunil Dutt,  Waheeda Rehman, Nirupa Roy, Rajendranath and Mumtaz.

Shot in the Chambal Valley ravines of Bhind-Morena under police protection in Madhya Pradesh state, and Mohan Studios, Mumbai the film highlights the acting talents of its star cast: Waheeda Rehman and Sunil Dutt. The music is by the composer Jaidev. It was the fourth highest grossing Bollywood film of the year, and the official selection at the 1964 Cannes Film Festival. The film was also the second success in a row of actor Sunil Dutt's production banner, Ajanta Arts, after Yeh Rastey Hain Pyar Ke, which had been released earlier that year. Mujhe Jeene Do was India's third "dacoit" film, a genre loosely inspired by Hollywood westerns, but more so by the menace of dacoity in Central India in the early 1960s. The film was a major success, like the earlier two other big films in the same genre, Ganga Jamuna (1961) and Raj Kapoor's Jis Desh Mein Ganga Behti Hai (1960).

Overview
Dacoits were traditionally shown as a rogue or menace to the society, especially in Hindi cinema, here for the first time film director, tried to show them in a fresh humanist perspective, thereby giving the film its memorability.

The film's humanist angle is credited to its director Moni Bhattacharjee, who earlier assisted realist cinema master Bimal Roy in Do Bigha Zamin (1953) and Madhumati (1958), before turning director himself.

The film was film actor Sunil Dutt's second film as a film producer, after Yeh Rastey Hain Pyar Ke (1963), through which he yet again tried to break away from the traditional romantic leads he was offered in the mainstream Hindi cinema. Though, here again, his role turned out to be that of romantic dacoit, though his acting received wide acclaim, and even Filmfare Best Actor Award of 1965.

Both Mujhe Jeene Do and Yeh Raaste Hain Pyaar Ke were written by Sunil's best friend and favourite screenwriter, Aghajani Kashmeri.

Synopsis
Mujhe Jeene Do, is a classic dacoit drama from the western films genre, a story about how love can lead to the redemption of even a hardened criminal like Thakhur Jernail Singh (Sunil Dutt), who is a noted dacoit in Chambal Valley.

One night, he happens to meet Chameli (Waheeda Rehman) a courtesan, at a wedding she was performing at. They elope and fall in love, later they have a son. But their romance is short-lived as he is about to be captured by the police, that is when Jernail sends Chameli away to a neighbouring village to raise their son, as he is sure of his end.

Unfortunately, the village she goes to has an old grudge with the Jamila to settle and attacks the hapless mother and son as a mob, but the police save them in time, and even promises them the seized property of Jernail.

Cast
 Sunil Dutt as Thakur Jarnail Singh
 Waheeda Rehman as Chameli Jaan
 Nirupa Roy as Champa
 Durga Khote as Dara Khan's Mom
 Rajendra Nath  as Dara Khan
 Manorama as Chamelijaan's Mom
 Siddhu as Thakur Kirpal Singh
 Anwar Hussain as Phool Singh
 Tarun Bose as Superintendent of Police
 Kumari Naaz as Chauthi Begum (as Naaz)
 D.K. Sapru as Zamindar
 Mumtaz as Farida - Dhara's Sister
 Wasi Khan
 Mohan Choti as Kripal Singh's Goon
 Madhumati as item number
 Cuckoo as item number
 Krishan Dhawan as School-teacher
 Asit Sen as Pandit Ram Avtar
 Rashid Khan as Maulana Sheikh Rahim
 Dulari as Phool Singh's Wife

Soundtrack
The music of Jaidev, coupled with lyrics by Sahir Ludhianvi, add to the tragic nature of the film. Also standing out is the cheerful song Nadi Naare sung by Asha Bhosle, noted for perfect rendition of the high-pitched song.

Awards
 1964 Filmfare Best Actor Award: Sunil Dutt - Won
 1964 Cannes Film Festival: Official selection, in competition for awards

References

External links
 
 Mujhe Jeene Do at Waheeda Rehman Retrospective, 2001

1963 films
Indian crime drama films
1963 crime drama films
Indian Western (genre) films
1963 Western (genre) films
1960s Hindi-language films
Indian black-and-white films
Films scored by Jaidev
1960s Urdu-language films
Films directed by Moni Bhattacharjee